The 1911 Maryland gubernatorial election took place on November 7, 1911.

Incumbent Governor Austin Lane Crothers did not seek re-election.

Republican candidate Phillips Lee Goldsborough defeated Democratic candidate Arthur Pue Gorman Jr.

General election

Candidates
Phillips Lee Goldsborough, Republican, former Comptroller of Maryland
Arthur Pue Gorman Jr., Democratic, incumbent President of the Maryland Senate
Charles E. Devlin, Socialist
John H. Dulany, Prohibition, farmer

Results

Notes

References

Gubernatorial
1911
Maryland